"Crush Tonight" is the lead single taken from Fat Joe's 2002 album Loyalty. It features R&B singer Ginuwine. The song peaked at #76 on the Billboard Hot 100.

2002 singles
Fat Joe songs
Ginuwine songs
Imperial Records singles
Song recordings produced by Cool & Dre
2002 songs
Songs written by Fat Joe
Songs written by Ginuwine
Songs written by Dre (record producer)
Songs written by Cool (record producer)